Julia Jung (born 4 October 1979) is a retired German swimmer who won one gold and two silver medals in the 4×200 m freestyle relay at the European and world championships in 1994 and 1995. In 1995, she also won a national title and a European gold medal in the 800 m freestyle.

In 1993 and 1994 she won six junior European championship titles, becoming one of the most successful junior European swimmers of all time. She was chosen the German Junior Sportswoman of the Year 1994.

She retired soon after missing the qualification for the 1996 Olympics due to a spine problem; she then completed her sports studies and worked as a swimming instructor.

References

External links
 

1979 births
Living people
German female swimmers
German female freestyle swimmers
Medalists at the FINA World Swimming Championships (25 m)
World Aquatics Championships medalists in swimming
European Aquatics Championships medalists in swimming
20th-century German women
21st-century German women